Events from the year 1305 in the Kingdom of Scotland.

Incumbent
Monarch: Vacant

Events
 May – a parliament meets in Perth to elect the Scottish delegation to the Westminster parliament. 
 5 August – John de Menteith, a Scottish knight loyal to King Edward of England, captures William Wallace and turns him over to English soldiers at Robroyston.
 September – parliament meets and spends 20 days drafting an ordinance for Scottish administration. John of Brittany is appointed to serve as Guardian, assisted by a council of 22 Scottish aristocrats.
 Approximate date – Scottish physician Bernard Gordon writes his short treatise Lilium medicinae which will become the first known book by a Scot to be printed (c. 1480 in Paris).

Deaths
 23 August – William Wallace, landowner and leader of Scottish resistance. Executed in London.

See also

 Timeline of Scottish history

References

 
Years of the 14th century in Scotland
Wars of Scottish Independence